Fløtemysost or Fløytemysost is a type of brunost or brown cheese made from cow's milk. 

Fløtemysost  has a mild taste and bright color. The mild flavor has made fløtemysost very popular. Geitost, which is made from goat's milk, is the counterpart to fløtemysost.  Goat cheese has a stronger taste than fløtemysost.

Traditionally brunost was made on farms throughout Norway by boiling whey without the addition of milk or cream. This became a sugar rich, lean product. 
Fløtemysost was first made when Anne Hov added cow cream to cow whey  creating a firmer, fatty, more cheese-like product. Later, she added goat milk and Gudbrandsdalsost  was created.

See also
 List of cheeses

References

Norwegian cheeses
Cow's-milk cheeses